Christoph Wilhelm Ludwig Merck (11 October 1833 – 12 January 1899) was a German chemist and business executive, who served as senior partner and CEO of the chemical and pharmaceutical company Merck from 1885 until his death in 1899.

Wilhelm Merck was the youngest son of Emanuel Merck (1794–1855) and joined the family company in 1860; he became the company's head in 1885. He also served as president of the chamber of commerce of Darmstadt from 1882 to 1896.

References 

19th-century German chemists
German chief executives
Scientists from Darmstadt
Merck Group people
1833 births
1899 deaths